"Absolutely Positively" is a song by American singer Anastacia. It was written by Ne-Yo and Chuck Harmony and produced by the latter for her fourth studio album, Heavy Rotation (2008). The song was released by Mercury Records as the album's second single in February 2009, following a confirmation by Anastacia during a performance on This Morning on Monday, November 3, 2008. "Absolutely Positively" was released to European radio on November 7, 2008.

Background
"Absolutely Positively" was written by American R&B singer Ne-Yo and commissioned after her record company had suggested a more "urban dance" sound for her fourth studio album, Heavy Rotation. Commenting on his contribution, Anastacia elaborated in 2009: "I was so grateful that he knew who I was and then the fact that he wrote two songs." In 2017, Anastacia admitted in an interview with Attitude that the song "just wasn't my vibe."

Critical reception
Digital Spy editor Alex Fletcher wrote: "Soulful funk of "Absolutely Positively" has "Sound of 2008" stamped all over it." Another critic, Maddy Costa of The Guardian also called it "Stevie Wonder-style soul-funk." Virgin Media editor Ian Gittins praised the vocal performance, where Anastacia is "recalling vocal giants such as Patti Labelle on the playfully Motown-like "Absolutely Positively"."

Music video
A music video for "Absolutely Positively" was filmed in November 2008 and directed by Nigel Dick, who also directed Anastacia's videos for "I'm Outta Love" and "Cowboys & Kisses".

Promotion
Anastacia performed the song in 2008 and 2009 at the following events:
 at the World Music Awards 2008 in Monte Carlo
 in Zürich at "Energy Stars for Free 2008"
 on the Paul O'Grady Show in England
 in Madrid at "Los Premios 40 Principales"
 on the Italian version of X Factor in 2009

Track listing

Notes
  denotes additional producer

Credits and personnel
 Lead vocals: Anastacia
 Background vocals: Anastacia, Ne-Yo
 Producers: Chuck Harmony
 Co-Producers: Ne-Yo
 Recorded by Chuck Harmony at The Carrington House in Atlanta, GA
 Vocals recorded by Bill Malina at Westlake Recording Studios in Los Angeles, CA

Charts

Release history

References

External links
 Anastacia's official website
 Anastacia's official YouTube channel
 "Absolutely Positively" official music video on YouTube

2008 singles
Anastacia songs
Music videos directed by Nigel Dick
Songs written by Ne-Yo
Songs written by Chuck Harmony
Song recordings produced by Chuck Harmony
2008 songs
Mercury Records singles